István Bognár (born 6 May 1991) is a Hungarian football midfielder who plays for MTK Budapest.

Club career
He played in Újpest FC B, but was a member of Újpest FC first squad. He is the son of former Hungarian international player György Bognár.

Ferencváros
On 10 January 2017, Bognár was signed by Nemzeti Bajnokság I club Ferencvárosi TC. Two days later it was also revealed that Ferencváros did not pay for Bognár for Diósgyőri VTK because the two clubs rather exchanged their two players. Busai was exchanged for Bognár by the two clubs.

Aris Limassol
On 1 February 2022, Bognár joined Aris Limassol in Cyprus on loan.

International career
He was called up to the senior Hungary squad to face Faroe Islands in August 2016.

Club statistics

References

External links
hlsz.hu 
MLSZ 

1991 births
Living people
Footballers from Liège
Hungarian footballers
Association football midfielders
Újpest FC players
Mezőkövesdi SE footballers
Diósgyőri VTK players
Ferencvárosi TC footballers
MTK Budapest FC players
Paksi FC players
Aris Limassol FC players
Nemzeti Bajnokság I players
Nemzeti Bajnokság II players
Cypriot First Division players
Hungarian expatriate footballers
Expatriate footballers in Cyprus
Hungarian expatriate sportspeople in Cyprus